Fed, The Fed or FED may refer to:

People 
 Andrey A. Fedorov (1908–1987), Soviet Russian biologist, author abbreviation
 Feds, a slang term for a police officer in several countries
 John Fedorowicz (born 1958), American International Grandmaster of chess also called "The Fed".
 Roger Federer (born 1981), Swiss tennis player sometimes referred to as "Fed".

Other uses 
 Front-end web development
 Fed (album), a 2002 album by American musician Liam Hayes
 FED (camera), a Soviet rangefinder camera
 "Fed" (Law & Order), episode of the television series Law & Order
 The Fed (newspaper), a student newspaper published at Columbia University
 Federal government of the United States, the national branch of government in the United States
 Federal Reserve, the central banking system of the United States, or one of its regional banks (e.g., the "Boston Fed")
 Field emission display, a type of flat panel display
 Fort Edward station, New York, United States; Amtrak code FED
 South Wales Miners' Federation, a Welsh trade union, nickname
 Fuchs' endothelial dystrophy

See also
Fede (disambiguation)
Federal (disambiguation)
Feed (disambiguation)